Medixsysteme company is one of the world's manufacturers of medical equipment based in Liechtenstein. The company offers products, services and research in Medical aesthetic.

Description 

MEDIXSYSTEME, develops sells and exports medical devices for specialized clinics in plastic surgery, aesthetic medicine and dermatology markets in 50 countries on 4 continents.

Corporate history 
Created in 2002 in Nîmes, France, by 2 major shareholders, the company is privately held.

At creation of the company several patents and trademarks have been registered.
Products which are fully CE medical certified for the EU market. In other part of the world additional accreditation: such TGA approved in AUSTRALIA, ANVISA in BRASIL, CIS in RUSSIA...ETC.

References

External links 
 fusfoundation TIME magazine features focused ultrasound as one of this year's 50 best inventions
 Cosmetic News The Voice of the Aesthetics Industry (Magazine Cosmetic)
 Miinews Medical Insight, Inc (Magazine The Aesthetic Guide)
 aestheticmedicinenews IAPAM, (International Association for Physicians in Aesthetic Medecine)
 Medixsysteme Official WebSite

Health care companies established in 2002
2002 establishments in France
Medical technology companies of Liechtenstein
Brands of Liechtenstein
2002 establishments in Liechtenstein